Rat Race was to be a downloadable episodic video game on the PlayStation Store. It was later cancelled by Sony.

Gameplay
Rat Race is a comedy/adventure game, that would have been available as individual episodes on the PlayStation Store. Rat Race was meant to be set in a dysfunctional office. The player's mission is simply to make it through the day as bombs go off all around him.

References

External links
 PlayStation Blog interview

Adventure games
Cancelled PlayStation 3 games
Sony Interactive Entertainment games